Washington Township, Michigan may mean:

 Washington Township, Gratiot County, Michigan
 Washington Township, Macomb County, Michigan
 Washington Township, Sanilac County, Michigan

See also
Washington Township (disambiguation)

Michigan township disambiguation pages